Regional College of Management (RCM), Bhubaneswar is the oldest and the first management institute in the state of Odisha established in the year 1982. The college has been approved under section 2(f) and 12 (b) of the UGC Act. The institute has been conferred the status by UGC in the year 2009. The institution offers graduate and post-graduate courses in management. The MBA & MCA programs are accredited by AICTE and UGC. The institution is approved internationally by the Council of Higher Education Accreditation (CHEA).

References

External links
MBA College in Bhubaneswar | PGDM College in Bhubaneswar Management Notes, Study Materials, MBA, PGDM
Regional College of Management - RCM, Bhubaneswar  Regional College of Management - Bhubaneswar - Course Details
 Regional College of Management - Bhubaneswar - Reviews
Regional College of Management, Bhubaneswar Placements 2019 – Salary Package, Trends & Stream-wise Placement Regional College of Management - Bhubaneswar - Placement

Business schools in Odisha
Universities and colleges in Bhubaneswar
Educational institutions established in 1982
1982 establishments in Orissa